Heaton Stannington Football Club is a semi-professional football club based in High Heaton, Newcastle upon Tyne, England.

History
The current club was established in 1910, although an earlier version of the club was playing in the Newcastle and District Amateur League until resigning in December 1904. They did not join a league until 1913, when they entered the Tyneside Minor League. The following season the club switched to Division Two of the Northern Amateur League. After gaining promotion to Division One, the club won the league's Challenge Cup in 1935–36 before winning the league title the following season. They then moved up to the Tyneside League, finishing as runners-up in 1938–39.

In 1939 Heaton Stannington were elected to the Northern League. They finished bottom of the league in 1948–49 and 1949–50, and after two more bottom three finishes, the club left the Northern League in 1952 to join the Northern Alliance. After four seasons in the Alliance, they returned to the Northern Amateur League. The club joined the relaunched North Eastern League in 1959, but left after a single season to join the Northern Combination, where they played until joining the Wearside League in 1973.

Financial problems led to Heaton Stannington resigning from the Wearside League and joining the Tyneside Amateur League in 1982, where they played as Heaton United for the 1982–83 season. They were league champions the following season and moved up to the Northern Amateur League, which they won in 1985–86. They then moved up to the Northern Alliance. When the league gained extra divisions in 1988 the club became members of the Premier Division, which they played in until being relegated to Division One at the end of the 1995–96 season.

A fourth-place finish in Division One in 1998–99 saw Heaton Stannington promoted back to the Premier Division. However, they were relegated again at the end of the 2000–01 season. After finishing as Division One runners-up in 2003–04 the club were promoted to the Premier Division. The 2011–12 season saw the club win the Premier Division, and after retaining the title the following season, they were promoted to Division Two of the Northern League. In 2021–22 the club were runners-up in Division Two, going on to win the promotion play-offs and earn promotion to Division One.

Ground
The original Heaton Stannington club played at Miller's Lane. When the club was re-established, they played at Paddy Freeman's Park before moving to the Coast Road ground. In October 1935 they moved to their current ground, which was known as Newton Park until being renamed Grounsell Park in 2007 in honour of Bob Grounsell. The ground was built on a disused quarry.

Honours
Northern Alliance
Premier Division champions 2011–12, 2012–13
League Cup winners 2010–11, 2012–13
Challenge Cup winners 1989–90
Combination Cup winners 1997–98
Subsidiary Cup winners 1999–2000
Northern Amateur League
Division One champions 1936–37, 1985–86
Challenge Cup winners 1935–35, 1937–38, 1956–57, 1958–59
Tyneside Amateur League
Champions 1983–84

Records
Best FA Cup performance: Second qualifying round, 1949–50
Best FA Vase performance: Third round, 1974–75

See also
Heaton Stannington F.C. players

References

External links
Official website

Football clubs in England
Football clubs in Tyne and Wear
Association football clubs established in 1910
1910 establishments in England
Northern Football League
Northern Football Alliance
North Eastern League
Wearside Football League
Tyneside Amateur League